Sylosis is a British heavy metal band from Reading, Berkshire, England. Signed to Nuclear Blast Records, the band has released five studio albums, a live album, two EPs and twelve music videos. Their fifth album Cycle of Suffering was released on 7 February 2020.

History

Formation and Conclusion of an Age (2000–2009)
Sylosis was formed in 2000 by guitarist Josh Middleton and bassist Carl Parnell who began playing extreme metal with other friends from school. Sylosis released a couple of EPs; 2006's Casting Shadows and 2007's The Supreme Oppressor in the UK on a small indie label, In at the Deep End Records. In December 2007 Sylosis signed with Nuclear Blast Records, and they released their debut album Conclusion of an Age in October 2008.

On the style of their debut album, Conclusion of an Age, Middleton remarked, "The foundation of our sound is old school Bay Area thrash. We don't downtune and we don't play breakdowns. We do like to incorporate lots of different metal styles and textures into our music. We like make all of our songs really epic. We like progressive stuff, brutal stuff and melodic stuff." After recording their debut studio album, guitarist Gurneet Ahluwalia was replaced by ex-Viatrophy guitarist Alex Bailey, ready for the early 2009 European tour with The Black Dahlia Murder, Cephalic Carnage and Psycroptic.

Sylosis were one of the opening acts on the Tuborg (third) stage at Download Festival held at Castle Donington, along with appearances at the New England Metal and Hardcore Festival, and an opening slot on the Bohemia stage at Sonisphere Festival. A UK headline tour was announced for October/November 2009, but was cancelled as the band were offered an opening slot on the DragonForce UK tour in November/December 2009.

Edge of the Earth, Monolith, and RV Accident (2010–2013)

Sylosis replaced Rise to Remain during the UK leg of As I Lay Dying's European tour in 2010.
Sylosis entered the studio in 2010 to record their second full-length studio album, entitled Edge of the Earth; it was released in March 2011.
They recorded a third studio album titled Monolith with Romesh Dodangoda in Wales at Monnow Valley Studio. Monolith was released on 5 October 2012 in Germany, 8 October 2012 in UK & Europe, 9 October 2012 in USA, and 10 October 2012 in Japan via Nuclear Blast Records. Since January 2013 the band have headlined a UK tour as well featuring on the Soundwave Festival in Australia. They also carried out a tour with the bands Hellyeah, In Flames and, headliner Lamb of God in late 2012. The band had a main supporting role on a tour with Killswitch Engage in Europe during April and May 2013. Sylosis was announced as the opening band for the Trivium and DevilDriver North American co-headline tour with After the Burial as another supporting band. The tour was scheduled for October and November.

On 25 September, the members of Sylosis were involved in an RV accident, the injuries from which resulted in the withdrawal of their shows supporting Trivium and DevilDriver.

Dormant Heart, departure of Rob Callard, and hiatus (2014–2016)
After the members of Sylosis had recovered from their respective injuries, they embarked on a tour of the UK and Europe as main support to DevilDriver with Bleed from Within. On this tour Sylosis drummer Rob Callard was unable to play on the tour due to other commitments. Ali Richardson, drummer of Bleed From Within, filled in for the remainder of the tour.

In late September 2014 it was announced that Rob Callard was stepping down as drummer of Sylosis after nine years of playing in the band. His replacement was announced at the same time, in the form of Ali Richardson. Richardson's relationship with Sylosis was started on the DevilDriver tour earlier in the year. 

At the start of October 2014, Sylosis announced details of their fourth album Dormant Heart, which was released on 12 January 2015 through Nuclear Blast Records.

During the second half of May 2015, Sylosis started a European tour with the band Wovenwar. They also played at several festivals over the summer, such as Graspop Metal Meeting and Hellfest among others.

In October 2016, Sylosis announced that they would be going on hiatus as frontman Josh Middleton would be filling in for the British metalcore band Architects on guitar due to the passing of their guitarist Tom Searle, who was also a close friend of Middleton's. After 11 months of touring with Architects, it was announced that Middleton would be joining Architects as an official member, stating he would still remain in Sylosis.

Return and Cycle of Suffering (2019–present)
In a March 2019 interview, Middleton confirmed that the band remains a going concern and that he intends to release a new Sylosis album in 2019. On 5 December 2019 Nuclear Blast revealed the pre-order for an apparent new record titled Cycle of Suffering, to be released on 14 February 2020. A day later, the band announced they had returned from their hiatus and confirmed that the new album would be released on 7 February 2020. This was followed by the first single release and music video from the album, titled "I Sever".

In promotion of the album, the band supported Trivium on their "A Light or a Distant Mirror" live concert. This particular concert was held at Full Sail University and streamed online. The concert did not have a live audience due to the COVID-19 pandemic.

On 11 December 2020, Sylosis released a new single, titled "Worship Decay".

On 8 March 2021, Sylosis announced a vinyl release of Conclusion of an Age and released "Plight of the Soul", a previously unreleased B-side track from the album.

On 3 December 2021, Sylosis released a new single titled "Immovable Stone" to which Josh Middleton stated a new album will be released early 2022. On 9 August 2022, Sylosis released a new single "Heavy is the Crown", the first of the trilogy of singles to be released in 2022.

Band-members

Current members
 Josh Middleton – guitars (2000–present), vocals (2010–present)
 Alex Bailey – guitars (2008–present)
 Ali Richardson – drums (2014–present)
 Conor Marshall – bass  (2019–present)

Former members
 Glen Chamberlain – vocals (2000–2003)
 Jay Colios-Terry – drums (2000–2005)
 Ben Hollyer – vocals (2003–2007)
 Gurneet Ahluwalia – guitars (2000–2007)
 Chris Steele – drums (2006–2007)
 Richard Zananiri – guitars (2005–2008)
 Jamie Graham – vocals (2007–2010)
 Rob Callard – drums (2005–2006, 2007–2014)
 Carl Parnell – bass (2000–2019)

Touring members
 Gurneet Ahluwalia – guitars (2012)
 Brandon Ellis – guitars  (2011)

Timeline

Discography

Studio albums
 Conclusion of an Age (Nuclear Blast, 2008)
 Edge of the Earth (Nuclear Blast, 2011)
 Monolith (Nuclear Blast, 2012)
 Dormant Heart (Nuclear Blast, 2015)
 Cycle of Suffering (Nuclear Blast, 2020)

EPs
 Casting Shadows (In at the Deep End, 2006)
 The Supreme Oppressor (In at the Deep End, 2007)

Live-albums
 Sylosis Live at High Voltage (2011)
 Sylosis Live At: Lite Up Studios (2020)

Singles

 Strength Beyond Strength (Pantera Cover, 2009)

Slings and Arrows (2012)
Mercy (2014)
Different Masks on the Same Face (2016)
I Sever (2019)
Calcified (2020)
Worship Decay (2020)
Immovable Stone (2021)
Heavy Is The Crown (2022)
Deadwood (2023)

Music-videos
Teras (2008)
After Lifeless Years (2009)
Empyreal (2011)
A Serpent's Tongue (2011)
Fear the World (2012)
Mercy (2014)
Leech (2015)
Servitude (2015)
I Sever (2019)
Calcified (2020)
Cycle of Suffering (2020)
Worship Decay (2020)
Immovable Stone (2021)

References

External links

English heavy metal musical groups
Musical groups established in 2000
Musical groups from Reading, Berkshire
Musical quartets
Nuclear Blast artists
2000 establishments in England